Albert Inalovich Tskhovrebov (born 1 May 1993) is a Russian professional football player.

Club career
He made his Russian Football National League debut for FC Alania Vladikavkaz on 7 April 2011 in a game against FC Nizhny Novgorod.

External links
 
 Career summary by sportbox.ru
 

1993 births
Sportspeople from Vladikavkaz
Living people
Association football defenders
FC Spartak Vladikavkaz players
FC Tosno players
FC Yenisey Krasnoyarsk players
FC Metalurgi Rustavi players
Russian First League players
Russian Second League players
Erovnuli Liga players
Russian footballers
Russian expatriate footballers
Expatriate footballers in Georgia (country)